The Rural Municipality of Langenburg No. 181 is a rural municipality (RM) in the Canadian province of Saskatchewan within Census Division No. 5 and  Division No. 1. It is located in the east-central portion of the province.

History 
The RM of Langenburg No. 181 incorporated as a rural municipality on January 1, 1913. It was previously established as Local Improvement District No. 79 on May 1, 1897.

Geography

Communities and localities 
The following urban municipalities are surrounded by the RM.

Towns
Langenburg

Villages
Yarbo

The following unincorporated communities are within the RM.

Localities
Marchwell

Demographics 

Government 
The RM of Langenburg No. 181 is governed by an elected municipal council and an appointed administrator that meets on the second Thursday of every month. The reeve of the RM is Terry Hildebrandt while its administrator is Krystal Johnston. The RM's office is located in Langenburg.

References 

Langenburg

Division No. 5, Saskatchewan